John Harron (March 31, 1903 – November 24, 1939) was an American actor. He appeared in more than 160 films between 1918 and 1940. Born in New York, New York, he was the brother of actor Robert Harron and of actress Mary Harron. Harron died in Seattle, Washington from spinal meningitis.

Selected filmography

 Through the Back Door (1921)
 The Fox (1921)
 The Grim Comedian (1921)
 The Five Dollar Baby (1922)
 The Ragged Heiress (1922)
 Love in the Dark (1922)
 The West~Bound Limited (1923)

 Dulcy (1923)
 The Fire Patrol (1924)
 What Shall I Do? (1924)
 Below the Line (1925)
 My Wife and I (1925)
 The Wife Who Wasn't Wanted (1925)
 Satan in Sables (1925)
 Old Shoes (1925)
 The Night Cry (1926)
 Hell-Bent for Heaven (1926)
 The Boy Friend (1926)
 Rose of the Tenements (1926)
 The False Alarm (1926)
 Love Makes 'Em Wild (1927)
 Closed Gates (1927)
 Once and Forever (1927)
 Night Life (1927)
 Naughty (1927)
 Green Grass Widows (1928)
 The Man in Hobbles (1928)
 Their Hour (1928)
 Street Girl (1929)
 The Czar of Broadway (1930)
 The Easiest Way (1931)
 Laugh and Get Rich (1931)
 The Law of the Tong (1931)
 Beauty Parlor (1932)
 Sister to Judas (1932)
 White Zombie (1932)
 Talent Scout (1937)
 The Invisible Menace (1938)
 The Roaring Twenties (1939) as Soldier
 The Oklahoma Kid (1939)
 Lincoln in the White House (1939)

External links

1903 births
1939 deaths
Deaths from meningitis
American male film actors
American male silent film actors
American Roman Catholics 
Male actors from New York (state)
20th-century American male actors
Neurological disease deaths in Washington (state)
Infectious disease deaths in Washington (state)